Homberg is an Ortsgemeinde – a community belonging to a Verbandsgemeinde – in the Westerwaldkreis in Rhineland-Palatinate, Germany. It belongs to the Verbandsgemeinde of Rennerod, a kind of collective municipality.

Geography

The community lies in the Westerwald between Siegen and Limburg on the 634 m-high Homberg (mountain). About 1 km to the west is found the Breitenbach Reservoir on the Breitenbach, an eastern tributary to the river Nister.

History
In 1256, Homberg had its first documentary mention as Hoimberch über dem Westerwald.

Politics

Community council
The council is made up of 6 council members who were elected in a majority vote in a municipal election on 13 June 2004.

Mayor
The community's mayor (Bürgermeister) is Michael Gräb (independent).

Economy and infrastructure

South of the community runs Bundesstraße 255, leading from Montabaur to Herborn. The nearest Autobahn interchange is Herborn on the A 45 (Dortmund–Hanau), some 20 km away. The nearest InterCityExpress stop is the railway station at Montabaur on the Cologne-Frankfurt high-speed rail line.

References

External links
Homberg 
Homberg in the collective municipality’s Web pages 

Municipalities in Rhineland-Palatinate
Westerwaldkreis